Te Raekaihau Point  is a rugged coastal landform in Wellington, New Zealand, adjacent to Princess Bay, between Houghton Bay to the west and Lyall Bay to the east on the south coast. One meaning of the name is "the headland that eats the wind". Te Raekaihau Point proceeds from the Southern Headlands Reserve and remains an undeveloped interface with the Cook Strait.

The site was the centre of recent controversy as a non-profit developer had proposed building an educational and tourist aquarium building on the site, which remains undeveloped.

Official LINZ Specification

Te Raekaihau

 District: Wellington
 Description: Marine rock formation
 Lat: -41.3497
 Long: 174.7926
 NZMG Easting: 2660010
 NZMG Northing: 5982778.2
 NZMS 260 sheet: R27
 LINZ Geographic Place Names Database Record

Background
The point is geologically new, having been modified during the 1855 Wairarapa earthquake, in which land was uplifted by two to three metres.  It can be reached through Island Bay, Houghton Bay via Melrose, or Lyall Bay.  The point is used for diving, walking, scenic photography, relaxation, picnics, eco-tourism, nature study, and astronomy. The point is relatively free of light pollution, with little nearby population, no street lighting, and low adjacent population causing sky glow in the southern direction of Cook Strait.  The lessened light pollution means that Aurora Australis displays are sometimes visible. It is one of the few undeveloped coastal places within Wellington city.  Artists such as Bruce Stewart and Nick Dryden are inspired by this location.

Marine centre dispute
The Wellington Marine Conservation Trust planned a three-storey educational and tourist complex and aquarium at Te Raekaihau Point, to be known as the Aquarium of New Zealand, unrelated to the National Aquarium of New Zealand  in Napier, Hawkes Bay. To showcase the "unique marine environment of the Wellington region and New Zealand," the Trust endeavoured to develop the point and surrounding coastal area to service thousands of aquarium customers each week. It aimed to also provide education programmes about conserving the unique coastal features of New Zealand, partner with organisations for marine research and tourism purposes, and provide a base for "long term protection and enjoyment" of Wellington's marine resources and parking for over 100 vehicles . Wellington City Council provided backing for the concept in the form of substantial interest-free loans and grants for resource consent applications.

Widespread opposition from throughout Wellington sprung up. Some believed that the centre would be better sited in a place with an established tourism, parking, and convenience infrastructure. Many Wellington ratepayers believed that the $26 million price tag of the Marine Education Centre would be an excessive amount of spending, that the potential benefits were not worth the risk, and that the Council-supported Centre would not be economically self-sustainable and thus increase Wellington City Council's public debt. Local amateur astronomers in the Wellington region, who find the Point favourable for watching for aurorae, were also concerned that the existence of the centre, including a proposed late-night cafe, fast food restaurant, and lighted parking lot, might compromise the relatively unpolluted night skies of the area. Residents were also concerned about loss of access to the point.

The groups Save The Point Inc and GADOT (Group Against Development on Te Rae Kai Hau Point Incorporated) formed to fight the development,

The initial hearing for resource consent for the centre failed to reach a conclusion, after a strongly fought opposition by community members, and the process was restarted with new submissions being sought.  In the second round of submissions, approximately 10,000 submissions were received, with about half being in favour of the plan and half against. This time, organisers of the Marine Education Centre project were actively engaged in the collection of thousands of submissions, using push poll techniques and a large number of paid campaign workers.

In September 2007, the Environment Court ruled against the developers, with the conclusion that Te Raekaihau Point was most important as a wild and undeveloped aspect of the landscape. The ruling, which declared that a tourist aquarium development "would compromise the area's open space values and result in significant adverse effects on the landscape," may prove extremely important in that it will help protect other natural spaces along New Zealand's coast and interior.

Developers of the $20–30 million centre have reportedly depleted their funds, including those donated by pro-development businessmen such as Infratil chairman Lloyd Morrison and former mayor Mark Blumsky. Rongotai MP Annette King, who backed the proposal, said another site would have to be considered.

The not-for-profit organisations opposing the development also ran up considerable costs, and continue to run fundraising events.
Te Rae Kai Hau Point Fundraising events involving family fun and entertainment have been highly successful, with thousands of people participating this year alone. Summer Lovin music festival was one such event, as part of the Island Bay festival.

Many kiwi musicians have donated performances and music, many have written and performed songs about the South Coast at various events around Wellington. Olmecha Supreme have led the way, headlining many of the events, the next being the Sonic Arts Block Party at Aro basketball courts on May 5. Hannah Howes, DJ Melodic, Illmofigga, Psychedelic Jelly fish and the Boombox, Los Incas, and the poet Michael Dunningham also performed on 18 February, at Shorland Park.

Gallery

External links

 Save The Point is the primary organisation that opposes any building on the South Coast that contravenes the current 'Open Space' classification.
 GADOT Group Against Development on Te Rae Kai Hau Point Incorporated, is a secondary  organisation that opposes any development of the area.
 Rakiura Music is active in fundraising and awareness campaigning, especially opposed to any light pollution.
 WAS Wellington Astronomical Society opposes light pollution, and whose submission was instrumental in gaining an 'advisory' attached to the consent.
 The Wellington Marine Conservation Trust, backed by the Wellington City Council, proposed to build a Marine Centre at Te Raekaihau Point.

Headlands of the Wellington Region
Wellington City